Cuzăplac is a commune located in Sălaj County, Transylvania, Romania. It is composed of eight villages: Cubleșu (Almásköblös), Cuzăplac, Gălășeni (Tóttelke), Mierța (Nyerce), Petrindu (Nagypetri), Ruginoasa (Lapupatak), Stoboru (Vásártelke) and Tămașa (Almástamási).

Sights 
 Wooden Church in Cubleșu, built in the late 18th century, historic monument
 Wooden Church in Mierța, built in 1857
 Wooden Church in Stoboru, built in the late 18th century
 Reformed Church in Petrindu, built in the late 18th century, historic monument

References

Communes in Sălaj County
Localities in Transylvania